David William Fennario, (born David Wiper, 26 April 1947) is a Canadian playwright best known for Balconville (1979), his bilingual dramatization of life in working-class Montreal, for which he won the Floyd S. Chalmers Canadian Play Award. A committed Marxist, Fennario was a candidate for the Union des forces progressistes in 2003 and for Québec solidaire in 2007. He has been the subject of two National Film Board of Canada documentaries, David Fennario's Banana Boots and Fennario: His World On Stage.

His pen name, "Fennario," given to him by a former girlfriend, is from a Bob Dylan song, "Pretty Peggy-O."

Works

Without a Parachute (1972) (journals)
On the Job (1976) (play)
Nothing to Lose (1977) (play)
Balconville (1979) (play)
Joe Beef (1984) (play; based on the life and times of Joe Beef)
Doctor Thomas Neill Cream (1988) (play)
The Murder of Susan Parr (1989) (play)
The Death of René Lévesque (1991) (play)
Gargoyles (1997) (play)
Banana Boots (1998) (play)
Condoville (2005) (play)
Bolsheviki (2010) (play)
Motherhouse (2014) (play)

Further reading
Bowman, Martin (1982), Interview with David Fennario, in Cencrastus No. 8, Spring 1982, pp. 6 - 8,

References

External links
2005 Montreal Mirror profile
Canadian Theatre Encyclopedia article
Literary Encyclopedia article
Watch David Fennario's Banana Boots at NFB.ca

1947 births
20th-century Canadian dramatists and playwrights
21st-century Canadian dramatists and playwrights
Writers from Montreal
Living people
People from Verdun, Quebec
Anglophone Quebec people
Canadian socialists
Québec solidaire candidates in Quebec provincial elections
Union des forces progressistes (Canada) politicians
Canadian dramatists and playwrights in French
Canadian male dramatists and playwrights
20th-century Canadian male writers
21st-century Canadian male writers